

Highest-grossing films

List of films
A list of films released in Japan in 2005 (see 2005 in film).

External links
 Japanese films of 2005 at the Internet Movie Database
 2005 in Japan
 2005 in Japanese television
 List of 2005 box office number-one films in Japan

2005
Japanese
Films